Chromosome 9 open reading frame 116 is a protein that in humans is encoded by the C9orf116 gene.

References

Further reading